Emadiyeh-ye Sofla (also Romanized as ‘Emādīyeh-ye Soflá; also known as ‘Emādīyeh) is a village in Mian Rokh Rural District, Jolgeh Rokh District, Torbat-e Heydarieh County, Razavi Khorasan Province, Iran. At the 2006 census, its population was 105, in 25 families.

References 

Populated places in Torbat-e Heydarieh County